Villamañán is a town located in the south-west of the province of León, Spain, in the area known as Esla, in the autonomous community of Castile and León in Spain.

It was originally known as Villamagna, but the name evolved to its current version, Villamañán.

Demographics 
Villamañán has a population of 1,287 as of the INE'''s (Spanish Census Bureau) 2005 estimate. 633 of the population are males and 654 are females.

 Villamañán (the town) 
 

Villamañán is located in the south-west of the province of León in the autonomous community of Castile and León in Spain.
It is located within a distance of 37 km of the city of León. Its total area is 57,8 km². There are 736 households and its population is of 1,287.

Some of the most famous places in town are Plaza Mayor or La Plaza (the town's biggest and main square where the Villamañán's historical church and its tower are located, along with a famous candy and magazine shop), the historical and legendary church of La Zarza (literally means Church of the Blackberry, where the legend says the ghost of Virgin Mary appeared on a blackberry shrub and told the people who saw it to build a church there in her honor, hence the name Church of the Blackberry) and the park known as el Jardín (the Garden).

During the summertime every year Villamañán becomes a touristic spot and many visitors from all over Spain and even from other countries worldwide come visit and stay in town, but definitely most of the visitors who come to Villamañán come from the area in Spain called Asturias. There are two swimming pools in Villamañán open to the public which also happen to be social spots for everyone in town, one, located right next to the Villamañán's soccer field, visited every afternoon/evening by huge numbers of people, which is public and belongs to the Villamañán City Hall in which there are three different sized swimming pools, a big grass area to tan and relax on, a tennis court and a coffee shop that sells all kinds of drinks as well and is also a candy shop known as el bar de la piscina (the swimming pool's bar/coffee shop); and the other swimming pool, which happens to be private but open to the public, located outside of town but very close to it, in the Mayorga-Astorga drive which leads to Villamañán's neighbor town Valencia de Don Juan. This swimming pool and its number of visitors are much smaller than the public one's and it belongs to a small resort/hotel originally known as Covadonga but nowadays called Palazuelo.
There are many places for fun and partying in Villamañán. There are many coffee shops and bars in town such as Villamagna, Dacha, Casino, El Café de Curro, Casa Miro (this one is a restaurant as well), El Espolón and el bar de la piscina (this one open only during the summertime). There's also a club in Villamañán called Pub Savoy and many restaurants such as La Bodega "La Regenta", El Mirador or Los Girasoles (this one is a coffee shop and a bar as well).

Plus, every Wednesday morning and afternoon of the year nonstop there's a market in Plaza Mayor where from food to clothes and accessories can be found.

 Geography 
 42° 19′ 00″ North

 005° 34′ 59″ West

 Economy 
Villamañán's most important economic activity is corn and wheat agriculture.
There used to be a brick factory.

 Local holidays 

 Fiestas de la Zarza (Blackberry Holiday) 
This is the biggest and most important holiday in Villamañán.  It takes place in early  September, usually between the 5th, 6th or 7th and the 11th, 12th or 13th of the month.  This holiday is celebrated in honor of Virgen de la Zarza or the Virgin of the Blackberry, who happens to be Virgin Mary, known as Virgin of the Blackberry because of the legend that says she appeared on a blackberry shrub in Villamañán and told the people who saw her to build a church right there in her honor.  The holiday is celebrated between those dates because those are the dates the legend says the Virgin of the Blackberry appeared on.  Even though the holiday originally comes from something religious, the current way the holiday is celebrated absolutely lacks anything to do with religion, nor are the people who celebrate it religious or interested in religion at all for the most part.

One of the most important things of these holidays are the infamous Peñas -groups of people from Villamañán or somehow related to it, who usually are friends, that get together and create "clubs" in different places of the town, under certain requirements, to celebrate these holidays-. Peñas are definitely the life of the party and the most important aspect of the celebration of these holidays.  It is a very big tradition for people who celebrate the Blackberry Holiday or Fiestas de la Zarza to ir de peñas (go from "peña" to "peña"), for the most part late at night until well past the down and enjoy everything they have to offer, mostly, but not limited to, alcoholic drinks and music.

During Fiestas de la Zarza many events and activities for all ages such as contests, sport games and championships, etc., take place in the afternoons and evenings thanks to the peñas and to Villamañán's City Hall. Also, every year art galleries from town show exclusive and private artwork owned and/or created by people from Villamañán for a limited time only, while Fiestas de la Zarza last.   The most famous of all events that take place during these holidays is Concurso de Paellas or the Paella Contest, in which all peñas cook paellas and compete for the price of the best paella of them all. People can go and freely eat as much paella as they wish. This event takes place right next to a private swimming pool property of an apartment complex known as El Palacio and it is infamous because every year, it has become a tradition that almost every visitor to the Paella Contest ends up in the swimming pool, by their own will or if not, being thrown in by others. It is also a big tradition that every evening and night during Fiestas de la Zarza different bands from all over Spain play in Plaza Mayor until the morning hours.  Two nights during Fiestas de la Zarza there's a fireworks show.

The big number of rides and attractions spread all over Plaza Mayor and its surroundings is also very popular during Fiestas de la Zarza, as well as the Fiestas de la Zarza inauguration, which consists on throwing fireworks and bells from the Plaza Mayor historical church's tower ringing so hard that they can be heard from anywhere in the town and a parade that goes through almost every street in Villamañán.

 San Antonio (St. Anthony) 
Even though its official date is June 13, it is celebrated the prior or next Saturday to the official date.

This holiday is celebrated in honor of St. Anthony, and even though the holiday is in honor of a religious figure, nowadays its celebration has nothing to do with religion. Neither are the people who celebrate it religious at all for the most part, which happens with every holiday in Villamañán.  It's believed in Villamñán that St. Anthony brings good luck to the single and helps them find a significant other.  It's famous for the beautiful bonfire that is made at night right next to the park known as el Jardín's entrance and that various people jump off.  Traditions of this night are the band that plays all night in Plaza Mayor and each year comes from different places in Spain, a local contests, celebrated only this night, which consists of selling numbered tickets and then one ticket is chosen and its owner gets several prices and the free cookies and Spanish extremely strong alcoholic drink orujo that are given by volunteers late at night to everyone. Nowadays, when the band finishes their show, people continue partying around town until well past the down in places such as the club Puv Savoy and the park el Jardín.

 Santiago (St. Jack) 
Event though its official date is July 25, it's celebrated the prior or next Saturday to the official date.

St. Jack is a national holiday in Spain but it's celebrated in a very special way in Villamañán.  It is a big tradition that this day people get together, usually in el Jardín, in the late afternoon and evening to have different kinds of food and drinks that are given for free by volunteers and paid by Villamañán's City Hall.  The biggest food of them all is the famous Spanish food called chorizo and bread.  The celebration lasts all night long and there's also a band, each year from different places from all over Spain, playing in Plaza Mayor.

 San Marcos (St. Mark) 
This holiday takes place on April 25.  It is probably the smallest and least-celebrated holiday in Villamañán.  This day, people from Villamañán go in the morning and afternoon to la Ermita de San Pedro (the Church of St. Peter) located between the town of Villamañán and its neighbot town Villacé right in front of a cemetery and eat bread and cheese and have various drinks that are given away free by volunteers and paid by Villamañán's City Hall. Some years there has been a band playing in Villamañán on this holiday as well.

Sábado de Piñata (Pinhata Saturday)
It is celebrated the next Saturday after Spain's carnival takes place. Along with the holiday of San Marcos, this one has the smallest number of visitors. A costume contest and dance is celebrated late at night, usually in the building known as el Salón Cultural, which lasts until the morning hours. Everyone in town wears a costume this night and a band also plays in the dance. Originally this dance and contest used to take place at the coffee shop / bar Casino.

Monuments, historical buildings and places of interest
Some of the most notorious historical buildings in Villamañán are la Ermita de la Zarza (Church of the Blackberry), where the legend says the ghost of Virgin Mary appeared on a blackberry shrub that was right where the church is nowadays and told the people who saw it to build a church there in her honor (hence the name Church of the Blackberry) as well as the historical church located in Plaza Mayor along with its big tower that can be seen from anywhere in the town and even from outside of it and its bells that ring every hour and every half an hour nonstop, being heard from anywhere in town.

Typical foods
Villamañán is famous for its wine, whose kind is known as Prieto Picudo. It is made in small and private wine cellars as well as in the biggest wine cellar and factory in Villamañán known as Miñambres''.

References

External links
Villamañán's MySpace
Old Villamañán website's guestbook (still in use)
Villamañán's club Pub Savoy official website
Villamañán Red Cross official website
Villamañan's Peña 600 official website
Villamañán's Peña Los XI Mandamientos (the 11 Commandments) official website
 Villamañán 360 Virtual Tour: Plaza Mayor
The weather in Villamañán
Official Website of Villamañán Council

Municipalities in the Province of León